"Slow Flow" is the fourth and final single by The Braxtons taken from their debut album So Many Ways. The song was written by Sean "Sep" Hall, London Jones, Christopher "Tricky" Stewart, and produced by Allen "Allstar" Gordon. 

The song failed to chart in the U.S. but charted at #26 on UK Singles Chart becoming their highest chart to date. The song also charted in New Zealand at #38 on New Zealand Singles Chart.

Track listings and formats

Charts

References

1997 singles
American contemporary R&B songs